Lemyra maculifascia is a moth of the family Erebidae. It was described by Francis Walker in 1855. It is found in China (Shandong, Yunnan), Indonesia (Sumatra, Nias, Java, Bali, Borneo, Sulawesi, the Moluccas, Ambon Island, Buru, Lombok, Dammer, Aru), Timor, the Philippines, New Guinea and Australia (Western Australia and Queensland). It is found in secondary habitats, including bush, clearings in primary forests and plantations, from the sea level up to elevations of about 1,200 meters.

The wingspan is about 30 mm. The forewings are white with black markings. The hindwings are white with a series of round black spots.

The larvae have been reported feeding on the foliage of Dioscorea oppositifolia, Convolvulus and Erythrina species.

References

 

maculifascia
Moths described in 1855